The marbled frog or marbled marsh frog (Limnodynastes convexiusculus) is a species of ground-dwelling frog native to northern and north-eastern Australia, and southern New Guinea in both Indonesia and Papua New Guinea.

It is not to be confused with the spotted grass frog (Limnodynastes tasmaniensis), which was also formerly known as the "marbled frog" in South Australia.

Description
Adult marbled frogs reach about 4.5 centimetres (1.8 in) in length, sometimes larger. Toes are long and unwebbed. Grey to light brown on back with numerous prominent darker blotches. The belly is white. Males have a yellowish throat and numerous small sharp black spines on their backs. When disturbed their skin excretes large amounts of mucous.

Ecology and behaviour
The marbled frog tends to be solitary inhabiting thick ground vegetation and is more often heard than seen. Males often call from hidden sites, usually partly submerged beneath vegetation. Its call has been described as "a rapid series of uk uk uks".  Eggs are laid in a floating foam nest under vegetation and are small and brown. Tadpoles reach 7 centimetres (2.8 in) in length.

The marbled frog inhabits waterholes and pools in open grassland and woodland.

References

References

Limnodynastes
Amphibians of Western Australia
Amphibians of the Northern Territory
Amphibians of Queensland
Amphibians of Papua New Guinea
Amphibians of Western New Guinea
Amphibians described in 1878
Taxa named by William John Macleay
Frogs of Australia